Ținutul Crișuri (or Ținutul Someș) was one of the ten ținuturi ("lands") of Romania, founded in 1938 after King Carol II initiated an institutional reform by modifying the 1923 Constitution and the law of territorial administration. It comprised parts of Transylvania, and included the entire regions of Crișana and Maramureș. It was named after the rivers Crișul Alb, Crișul Negru, and Crișul Repede; its capital was the city of Cluj. Ținutul Crișuri ceased to exist following the territorial losses of Romania to Hungary in 1940.

Coat of arms
The Coat of Arms is composed of 7 sinister bends, 4 of gules and 3 of azure, representing the former seven counties (județe) of the Greater Romania (71 in total in 1938) it included. Over the mirror bends there is a sable aurochs head (in reference to Voivode Dragoș of Maramureș, and to the symbol of Moldavia - see Flag and coat of arms of Moldavia).

Former counties incorporated

After the 1938 Administrative and Constitutional Reform, the older 71 counties lost their authority. 
Bihor County
Cluj County
Maramureș County
Sălaj County
Satu Mare County
Someș County
Turda County

In 1939 Turda County was ceded to Ținutul Mureș in exchange for Năsăud County.

See also
 Historical administrative divisions of Romania
 Nord-Vest (development region)
 History of Romania

External links
Map

Crișana
Maramureș
Crisuri
1938 establishments in Romania
1940 disestablishments in Romania
States and territories established in 1938
States and territories disestablished in 1940